Shumkovo is a rural locality (a settlement) in Andreyevskoye Rural Settlement, Kishertsky District, Perm Krai, Russia. The population was 139 as of 2010.

Geography 
Shumkovo is located 14 km east of Ust-Kishert (the district's administrative centre) by road. Andreyevo is the nearest rural locality.

References 

Rural localities in Kishertsky District